Robbie Gee (born 24 March 1970) is a British actor, best known for his Desmond's character "Lee Stanley", for appearing in Guy Ritchie's crime caper Snatch, and for his comedy roles in TV series like The Real McCoy and The Crouches. He also appeared in the film Mean Machine, playing "Trojan", Pirates of the Caribbean as "Shrimper", Underworld as "Kahn", and Dead Man Running as Curtis (Alongside 50 Cent).

Robbie is a founding member of GeeStor and along with Eddie Nestor makes up one half of a comedy duo. Together, they have written for TV and hosted music events.

Hosting
He hosted, alongside Eddie Nestor, the Imperial College Indian Society's annual "East Meets West" charity show in 2007 and 2008.

Filmography

Film

Television

References

External links

Black British male actors
1970 births
Living people
British male television actors
British male film actors
English people of Saint Kitts and Nevis descent
20th-century British male actors
21st-century British male actors